Julian Crane is a fictional character from the American soap opera Passions portrayed by original cast member Ben Masters.

In the soap's early years, Julian is portrayed as a drunken philanderer who shares an antagonistic, loveless marriage with his wife of over twenty years, Ivy Crane.  Though he tries to exude an image of confidence and power, Julian is in actuality desperate for his father's approval and becomes something of a villain, aiding his father in his attempts to separate Julian's sister, Sheridan, from her fiancé, Luis.

Julian eventually discovers that Ivy's ex-boyfriend, Sam Bennett, fathered Julian and Ivy's eldest son, Ethan; Julian is furious and privately heartbroken to learn the truth and divorces Ivy.  Julian later marries both Theresa Lopez-Fitzgerald and Rebecca Hotchkiss in 2001, though both their marriages are eventually revealed to be invalid, and he is presumed murdered early in 2002.  He is eventually revealed to be alive a few months later and embarks upon a magical journey with Tabitha Lenox's doll-turned-real-boy, Timmy, who is able to touch something in Julian's hard heart. After Timmy's death, Julian and his ex-girlfriend, Eve Russell, set out to find their long-lost son, and Julian eventually rekindles his love with Eve, leaving his amoral ways behind him. After becoming engaged, Julian and Eve break up in 2006, leading Julian to revert to philandering and scheming. His relationship with Eve grows complicated, Julian has rediscovers his softer side once more; he has completely abandoned his licentious behavior after this.

Character history

Early life
Julian was born in Harmony, New England, sometime in the 1950s to powerful billionaire Alistair Ephraim Crane and his first wife, Katherine Crane, and was raised as the heir apparent to the Crane empire and their only child; his parents later had a daughter, Sheridan, when he was a teenager.  Katherine loved her son deeply but was ultimately too naïve to realize her husband's plan to twist their son into his image until Julian had already grown to be a spoiled, amoral man who, as a member of a family with equal or higher social standing as that of the Kennedy family, came to see himself as American royalty.

Julian and his sister Sheridan were also verbally and emotionally abused by Alistair their whole lives. Also, both them witnessed Alistair emotionally and physically abuse Katherine, but neither one of them were aware that Katherine had been raped repeatedly by Alistair, until they were adults.

Upon graduating from high school, Julian began an affair with young Boston jazz singer Eve Johnson, who came from poor, African American roots. Julian fell in love with her, but he was also responsible for hooking her on drugs and alcohol. Eve eventually became pregnant, but Alistair called on Julian to marry former Governor Harrison Winthrop's young daughter Ivy as part of a business merger between Crane Industries and the Winthrops' financially floundering shipping fleet. After Julian married Ivy, Eve gave birth to a son who (apparently) died shortly after birth as a result of her alcohol and drug abuse early in her pregnancy.

Retconning
Julian's history has been retconned on more than one occasion. In 1999, it was stated that Julian had married Ivy shortly after graduating high school, when Sheridan was still an infant and Katherine was alive and well. When Katherine and Martin returned to Harmony in 2004, flashbacks revealed that Julian had been fourteen and Sheridan six when Katherine had "died" instead of the original twenty-nine and twelve.

Marriage to Ivy, 1974 - 2001
Ivy was unaware that Julian was not in love with her when she married him, and when she discovered the true nature of her marriage on her wedding night, she became cold to her new husband and froze him out of her bed. Though their marriage was loveless, they did occasionally experience brief bursts of passion, eventually producing four children together — son Ethan in 1975, daughter Fancy in 1980, son Nicholas Foxworth, and daughter Pretty.  After the birth of their final child, Ivy kicked Julian out of her bed, and Julian busied himself with other women; Julian did, however, occasionally try to seduce his frigid wife.

Julian was also a largely absent father. Though he paid some attention to Ethan, his heir, and took Fancy and her friend for ice cream in the third grade, Julian largely ignored his children, believing that "[c]hildren are sent away to become civilized, and then you get to know them."  Julian and Ivy sent all of their children to boarding school — the youngest three children were sent away at particularly young ages. When Passions begins in July 1999, all four children have been away from Harmony for some time; Ethan has just returned following his graduation from law school while Fox does not return until December 2002, Fancy until June 2005, and Pretty until July 2007.

While not philandering or bickering with Ivy, Julian desperately seeks to prove himself to his father, Alistair. On Alistair's orders, Julian plots to keep Sheridan away from Luis Lopez-Fitzgerald, going as far as to hire an imposter fitted with a Luis-mask to pretend to want Sheridan only for her money, though that plan ultimately fails.  Alistair eventually grows disgusted with Julian's failures and disinherits his son in favor of Ethan.

At Ethan and Theresa's engagement party, Julian is incensed, as well as privately devastated, to learn that, on their wedding night, Ivy sought comfort from ex-boyfriend Sam Bennett, fathering Ethan. Julian disowns Ethan and determines to divorce Ivy.

Musical wives and "murder", 2001 - 2002
After the paternity reveal, Julian begins sleeping with Rebecca Hotchkiss, Ivy's former best friend and Ethan's ex-fiancée Gwen Hotchkiss's mother. Together, on Alistair's orders, they poison Sheridan's wedding ring in the hopes that it will kill her and thus prevent her from being with Luis.

After Luis and Sheridan and Ethan and Theresa's failed double wedding, Julian flies to Bermuda to finalize his divorce from Ivy.  There, he comes across Theresa, who is desperate to have Ethan reinstated as the Crane heir. After drinking too much champagne, the two are married on August 14, 2001, and then sleep together. They quickly move to have their marriage annulled and plan to keep it a secret, Theresa in order to keep Ethan and Julian in the hope that Luis will not murder him for bedding his younger sister.  Julian at one point plots to kill Theresa, along with Ivy and Rebecca, who seeks to become his next wife, but his plan fails and Ivy eventually exposes Julian and Theresa's union.

Julian and Theresa's marriage is finally annulled, but, before he has time to celebrate, Rebecca arrives with a justice of the peace, and they are married on December 7.  However, at the Cranes' New Year's Eve party, Ivy reveals that Theresa was allegedly pregnant with and aborted Julian's baby, invalidating their annulment.  A number of Harmony's citizens — including Theresa, Luis, Pilar, Ivy, Ethan, Rebecca, TC, Eve, Antonio, and the supposedly deceased Sheridan — set out to murder Julian, sick of his evil ways.  Julian is later cornered in the Crane cannery by a mysterious figure — later revealed to be Liz Sanbourne, who decides to murder Julian after she cannot not find Alistair, had raped her when she was a teenager, in 2006 — and shot in the chest; he falls into a vat of boiling tuna, which is then chopped up, and he is believed to have been killed on January 17, 2002.

Return to Harmony, 2002 - 2003
Julian resurfaces in June 2002 when Tabitha Lenox's doll-turned-real-boy, Timmy, removes nasty short-order cook Peggy's mask and finds Julian alive and well beneath.  Julian, as it turns out, faked his death in an attempt to escape his would-be murderer. Julian agrees to help Timmy find the Demon's Horn to save his beloved Charity, who is frozen in a block of ice. The two go on a magical journey through the land of Oz, eventually returning to Harmony the night that Theresa was executed for Julian's "murder". Theresa's family is ready to kill Julian after they learned that Theresa has been executed for a murder that never took place, but their anger fades when they discover that Alistair saved Theresa, faking her execution to draw Julian out of hiding.

After settling back into life in Harmony, Julian learns that Timmy died on August 5. Deeply saddened to learn of the death of the boy who managed to touch his hard heart, Julian goes to pay his condolences to Tabitha, who presented herself as Timmy's great-aunt. After sharing a batch of Timmy's infamous Martimmys, the two have wild, drunken sex together.

Meanwhile, Julian is horrified to find that Theresa has been legally declared Mrs. Julian Crane in his absence; she takes control of much of the Crane family's money and refuses to allow Julian access to their infant son, Ethan Martin Crane, who was born shortly before Theresa's "execution" on June 21.  Julian and Rebecca seek for some way to end his marriage, and they are thrilled to finally discover on March 25, 2003, that Julian and Theresa's marriage license was never filed in Bermuda; the wedding was a practical joke by Julian's friends. Julian kicks Theresa out of his home and seeks custody of their baby, though he does eventually allow Theresa to live with Little Ethan at Sheridan's cottage on the estate.

After dealing with Theresa and Little Ethan, Julian receives a momentous shock — his night of passion with Tabitha resulted in her pregnancy. Julian and Rebecca help Tabitha to deliver the couple's daughter, Endora Lenox, on July 28, 2003. Julian admires his newborn daughter, but Tabitha refuses to allow Julian any custody, and they agree to keep Endora's paternity — and their one-night stand — a secret.

Rekindled romance with Eve, 2003 - 2006
After confronting his father, Julian and Eve learn that their infant son born in the 1970s is actually still alive. The former couple begin searching for their son, and Julian finds himself growing closer and falling in love with Eve once more. The pair's "relationship" encourages Julian to become a person, and he gives up his philandering and scheming ways. The two eventually profess their love for one another, but, in order to prevent Rebecca from outing Eve's past and destroying her family and career, Julian marries Rebecca on January 2, 2004; he also sues for custody of Little Ethan and allowed Ethan and Gwen to adopt the boy following the stillbirth of their own daughter, Sarah.

Julian's attempts to protect Eve all prove futile when Eve's vengeful half-sister, Liz, brings Eve's aunt Irma to Harmony, however. Irma tells Eve's husband, TC, about Eve's sordid past as a drug addict and prostitute, as well as her past with Julian. TC is furious; he has hated Julian ever since the car accident he believed that Julian caused had robbed him of his tennis career some thirty years prior. TC is ready to forgive Eve, however, until Irma divulges the fact that Eve gave birth to Julian's son. TC files for divorce, and Eve seeks comfort from Julian.

Julian goes to Alistair and demands that he release the identity of his and Eve's son. Alistair names the boy as Chad Harris, shocking Julian and Eve because Chad is engaged to Eve's eldest daughter, Whitney. Chad and Whitney are ripped apart by the news, and Whitney begins dating Julian's son Fox.  Whitney's relationship with Fox creates a great deal of animosity between the newfound half-brothers that Julian only exacerbates by frequently favoring Chad, feeling guilty for the miserable life that Chad lived as a foster child. Julian eventually names Chad as his heir.

When Liz is poisoned at Luis and Sheridan's failed second wedding in early 2005, Eve is charged with the murder, along with Julian's 2002 attempted murder and Alistair's December 2004 attempted murder. Julian stands by Eve and eventually makes a deal with Rebecca to have her confess that Liz poisoned herself, unaware that Rebecca actually poisoned Liz in an attempt to poison Eve. Julian is thrilled when Eve is acquitted, but is later horrified to learn that the agreement he signed with Rebecca prevents him from divorcing her.

Return of the "old" Julian, 2006 - 2007
After much begging, pleading, and bribing, Julian finally manages to divorce Rebecca in mid-2006, allowing him to marry Eve. Things begin to fall apart, however, when TC is involved in a drunk driving accident and suffers a stroke. Julian becomes jealous of the attention that Eve lavishes on her ex, and matters become even more strained when they discover that Chad is actually Alistair and Liz's son. Julian and Eve grow further apart, and they eventually end their relationship.

Julian's former "bad" self begins to re-emerge as he threatens to sue both Theresa and Tabitha for custody of his children, begins drinking heavily again, and resumes a casual sexual relationship with Rebecca; he also has sex with Valerie Davis on his desk and is pleased when Eve witnesses the event and sees the monster to which he has reverted.

Julian also begins to influence his children to embrace their Crane natures. After Fox learns that his fiancée, Kay Bennett, is planning to leave him for her ex, Julian aids Fox in his schemes to keep Kay. Together, Julian and Fox pretend that Fox is dying of a terminal brain ailment, and Julian hires Spike Lester to run Fox over with Miguel's car in an attempt to frame Miguel. Miguel is sentenced to life imprisonment for the attempted murder, and Julian makes a deal with Kay to have Miguel released if she promises not to leave Fox. Julian and Fox's plan falls apart, however, when Ivy accidentally tells Kay and Miguel that Fox is not really dying, and Kay leaves Fox.

Though Julian embraces his ruthless Crane genes, he does not completely revert to his former heartless self. Julian is devastated to learn that his eldest daughter, Fancy, has been brutally raped and fallen into a coma, and while he and Ivy try to cope with the news, the two end up sleeping together. After numerous one-night stands, the two, believing their respective relationships with Eve and Sam to be over, begin to consider reuniting.

However, Julian learns that Ethan, and not he, fathered Little Ethan and is furious with Theresa for lying to him. He plans to tell Ethan the truth, believing that control of Crane Industries will pass from Theresa to him, but eventually changes his mind when Theresa reveals that Alistair's will leaves everything to Fancy. In exchange for increased power at Crane Industries, Julian agrees to keep Little Ethan's paternity a secret even though he is, as he says himself, "stealing from Fancy, my own daughter". When Ivy learns of Julian's plans to increase his participation in Crane after they agreed to move some place quiet and alone, she is furious, and their budding relationship is largely destroyed.

Vincent, 2007 - 2008
Julian and Eve begin to make tentative steps back to each other when they begin to search for their real son. Eventually, they discover him to be tabloid editor Vincent Clarkson, who is none other than the mysterious Blackmailer who has been terrorizing Harmony for months. However, Julian refuses to allow Eve to turn Vincent, fearing the effect that the bad publicity will have on Crane Industries, even though Vincent twice raped Fancy and framed her boyfriend, Luis, for the rapes, along with two murders and arson. Eve eventually confesses to Vincent's duplicity just seconds before Luis is to be executed and both Pilar and Fancy condemn Julian.

Vincent is institutionalized, but later breaks free with Alistair's help and is presumed deceased on August 30; unknown to both Julian and Eve, Vincent is alive and determined to torment Eve for failing to prevent him from being abducted at birth. Vincent, a hermaphrodite, also becomes fixated on Julian and, as his alter-ego, Valerie, sleeps with his father and becomes pregnant; he eventually reveals the truth to Eve but threatens to murder her if she tells Julian.

Meanwhile, Julian keeps up his philandering and begins sleeping with Fancy's best friend, Esme Vanderheusen, much to Fancy's disgust. The two begin to develop feelings for each other, though much of their relationship is based on lust and Esme's desire for the Crane fortune. Esme tells her homicidal niece, Viki, of her plans to marry Julian, and when Viki overhears Julian tell Esme that Viki would be best raised at boarding school and away from Harmony, Viki determines to murder Julian before he can become her guardian. After Julian and Esme have sex in the Crane mausoleum, Viki stabs Julian multiple times in the groin, completely severing his penis.

Vincent then makes sure that Eve is drugged and drunk while she does surgery on Julian, and the effects are she didn't repair his penis, she turned it upside down. Julian now fears that he may never be able to have sex again, because if he has an erection it will kill him. At the wedding rehearsal, Julian reconciles with Eve once and for all and they agree to only go to each other for support, and when they're in trouble. Julian worries that he will never be able to make love with Eve, but Eve reassures him that they can make love emotionally and intellectually. Julian also vows now that Alistair is gone, the Crane family will be more responsible for their actions. Along with everyone else at the rehearsal dinner, Julian eats Vincent and Vicki's poison mushroom sauce, and dies. But, because of his daughter Endora's love for him, she has convinced her mother, Tabitha, to sacrifice her magic and resurrect all the people dead in the church.

In the series finale, Kay Bennett uses her magic powers to heal Julian's penis, making it possible for him and Eve to fully express their love to one another. It is assumed that Julian becomes head of the Crane Empire with Fancy and her unborn child as heirs presumptive based on Julian's statements.

See also
Vincent Clarkson
Crane family
Theresa Lopez-Fitzgerald
Rebecca Hotchkiss
Eve Russell
Esme Vanderheusen

References

External links
Julian at Soap Central

Passions characters
Fictional socialites
Fictional businesspeople
Fictional kidnappers
Television characters introduced in 1999
Fictional characters involved in incest
Male characters in television